The Bishops' Conference of Yugoslavia was an episcopal conference of the Catholic Church covering the territory of Yugoslavia. 

The first such bishops' conference was held in the Kingdom of Serbs, Croats and Slovenes in November 1918. The last conference was held in 1993 when the Croatian Bishops' Conference was established.

Successors 
Bishops' Conference of Bosnia and Herzegovina
Croatian Bishops' Conference
Slovenian Bishops' Conference
International Bishops' Conference of Saints Cyril and Methodius

Yugoslavia
1918 establishments in Yugoslavia
1993 disestablishments
Christianity in Yugoslavia